Acrolophus heppneri is a moth of the family Acrolophidae. It was described by Davis in 1990. It is found in North America, including the US states of Alabama, Florida, Mississippi and Texas.

The wingspan is about 17 mm.

References

Moths described in 1990
heppneri